{|{{Infobox aircraft begin
| name           = VMS Eve
| image          = VMS Eve Maiden Flight.jpg
| caption        = VMS Eves maiden flight
| alt            = 
}}

|}VMS Eve (Tail number: N348MS''')  is a carrier mothership for Virgin Galactic and launch platform for SpaceShipTwo-based Virgin SpaceShips. 
 VMS Eve was built by Scaled Composites for Virgin Galactic. The "VMS" prefix stands for "Virgin MotherShip".

Public launch

The aircraft was named after Evette Branson, the mother of Richard Branson, Chairman of the Virgin Group. The jet plane has nose art of a blonde woman holding a banner with the Virgin Galactic logo. The image is based on how Evette Branson looked when she was younger and is called Galactic Girl. The aircraft was officially launched on  July 28, 2008, in Mojave, California, the United States, at the Mojave Spaceport, home of Scaled Composites. On December 12, 2008, the aircraft performed first taxi tests, and a week later the maiden flight. Eve is being used in the Virgin Galactic testflight program, preceding entry into commercial usage.

Burt Rutan has dismissed fears that pressurization cycles might induce fatigue failure in the composite structure. Richard Branson has also announced that it will be highly fuel efficient.

 Flight test program 
The initial flight occurred on 21 December 2008, after an initial low speed taxi test was carried out at Mojave followed by a high speed taxi on 16 December. By September 2009 the flight envelope was extended to 50000 feet.   the total flight time for WhiteKnightTwo is 333.96 hours.

References
Citations

Bibliography
 BBC News, Branson unveils space tourism jet, 20:42 UTC, Monday, 28 July 2008 UK
 Los Angeles Times, Richard Branson unveils his space plane, July 29, 2008, Peter Pae
 Wired, Virgin Galactic Unveils White Knight Two Launch Vehicle, 07.29.08,Dave Bullock
 New York Times, New Steps in Private Space Travel, July 29, 2008, John Schwartz
 Reuters, Branson unveils plane to launch spaceship, Mon Jul 28, 2008  Fred Prouser
 Associated Press, New space race heats up with unveiling of aircraft, Alicia Chang
 Scientific American, Forget the Dark Knight--the White Knight Two mothership has arrived, Jul 28, 2008 Adam Hadhazy
 New Scientist, Virgin Galactic rolls out SpaceShipTwo's 'mothership', 28 July 2008, Rachel Courtland
 Telegraph'', Sir Richard Branson unveils Virgin's spaceship, 29 Jul 2008, James Quinn

External links

 Virgin Galactic - news
 Scaled Composites, Virgin Galactic Rolls Out Mothership Eve  - Jul 28, 2008 Press Release
 Scaled Composites, WHITEKNIGHTTWO FLIGHT TEST SUMMARIES

See also
 Blue Origin LPV Jacklyn, Blue Origin vehicle named after the founder's mother

Individual aircraft
Virgin Galactic
Eve
Scaled Composites
Space tourism
2000s United States airliners
Twin-fuselage aircraft